Fizzy Blood are a British alternative rock band from Leeds, England, formed in 2014. The group consists of Benji Inkley, Paul Howells, Jake Greenway, Ciaran Scanlon and Tim Malkin.

History 
Fizzy Blood have released two Extended plays: Feast (2015) via DMF Records and Summer Of Luv (2017) via Killing Moon/Alya Records.

The band has played at major music festivals such as Reading and Leeds Festivals, Download Festival, South by Southwest, as well as touring with bands such as Dead Kennedys, While She Sleeps and Dinosaur Pile-Up. Fizzy Blood supported Spring King in February 2018 in the United Kingdom.

In 2017, they were featured as band of the day in Metro. They have also been awarded new band of the week at Team Rock, and were a recipient of the Momentum Music Fund grant from PRS for Music.

Discography

EPs

Members
 Benji Inkley - lead vocals, guitar
 Paul Howells - guitar, vocals, keys
 Tim Malkin - keys, guitar, vocals
 Ciaran Scanlon - bass guitar
 Jake Greenway - drums

References 

Musical groups established in 2014
Alternative rock groups from Leeds
2014 establishments in England